Dancing in my Nuddy-Pants! is young adult novel (a romance aimed at girls aged 13–15), by British author Louise Rennison. It is the fourth book in the Georgia Nicolson series. The book was first published in Great Britain by Piccadilly Press in 2002.

Plot
The book is written in the form of a diary. It is about Georgia Nicolson (14), her friends (the Ace Gang), and her infatuation with boys (or snogging in particular). Georgia's boyfriend Robbie ('the sex god or SG') has been invited to go on tour with his band The Stiff Dylans. He has received an offer to go to Los Angeles in hamburger-a-gogo-land (United States), where Georgia is thinking of becoming a 'girlfriend to a pop-star'. At the end of the book he goes for an interview and gets a job in Whakatane (New Zealand) instead. Even though Georgia is upset about this she still has enough courage in her to (when her house is empty) dance in her nuddy-pants (naked).

Success
The work was preordered by roughly 80,000 readers and hit number one on the New York Times bestseller list, in the children's Books list in March 2003.

References

External links
 The Official Georgia Nicolson Website
 Author of the month: Louise Rennison on The Guardian website
 Try on 'Nuddy-Pants' for tween-age laughs on the USA TODAY website

2002 British novels
British young adult novels
British comedy novels
Fictional diaries
Confessions of Georgia Nicolson